Pleopeltis polypodioides (syn. Polypodium polypodioides), also known as the resurrection fern, is a species of creeping, coarse-textured fern native to the Americas and Africa.

Description

The evergreen fronds of this fern are 25 cm high by 5 cm wide and monomorphic. The leathery, yellow-green pinnae (leaflets) are deeply pinnatifid, oblong to narrowly lanceolate, usually widest near middle, occasionally at or near base. It attaches to the limbs of its host plant with a branching, creeping, slender rhizome, which grows to 2 mm in diameter. The scales are lanceolate, with light brown base and margins, and having a dark central stripe.

The gametophytes (the haploid gamete producers) of this plant develop from very small spores that float in the air and are deposited on moist tree branches. These spores are produced in sporangia that develop on the leaves of the fern's sporophyte. The fern can also reproduce by the division of its rhizomes.

On the underside of the blades, the sori (reproductive clusters) are round, discrete, and sunken. Their outline can be seen as raised dimples on the upper surface. They are typically near the outer edge, and occur on all but the lowest pinnae of fertile fronds. Indusium is absent. Sporangia are yellow to brown at maturity. Spores are produced from summer to fall.

Habitat 

This fern is an epiphyte, or air plant, which means it attaches itself to other plants and gets its nutrients from the air and from water and nutrients that collect on the outer surface of bark. The resurrection fern lives on the branches of large trees such as cypresses and can often be seen carpeting the shady areas on limbs of large oak trees repeatedly exposed to rainfall. However, it is known to grow on the surfaces of rocks and dead logs as well. It is often found in the company of other epiphytic plants such as Spanish moss.

The P. polypodioides resides in the hardwood forests of southeastern United States in areas including Delaware, Maryland, the Carolinas, Virginia, West Virginia, Illinois, Ohio, Alabama, Georgia, Florida, Mississippi, Arkansas, Texas and Oklahoma. This fern can also be found in areas such as subtropical America, parts of southern Africa and other humid or sub-humid climate areas.

Physiology and Rehydration 
The resurrection fern gets its name because it can survive long periods of drought by curling up its fronds and appearing desiccated, grey-brown and dead. However, when just a little water is present, the fern will uncurl and reopen, appearing to "resurrect". It has been estimated that these plants could last 100 years without water and still revive after a single exposure.

The resurrection fern roots have evolved to function as anchors for the epiphytes, holding them to their host tree’s bark and have been found to be inefficient in absorption. When in clustered groups of ferns on the bark of trees, the increased transpiration of the ferns and bark allow the middle ferns of the cluster to remain open longer than ferns on the outside. The relative humidity of the air and the closing rate of the leaves of the ferns is an inverse relationship. The greater the humidity, the slower the leaves of the ferns close because they have prolonged exposure to moisture in the air.

The resurrection fern can severely desiccate and lose almost all of its water. Experiments have shown they can lose up to 97%--and remain alive, though more typically they only lose around 76% in dry spells. For comparison, most other plants would die after losing only 8-12%. This fern can lose almost all the water not hydrating the cells in its leaves and survive. Upon rainfall or even minute exposures to water they can fully rehydrate and return to a normal state within 24 to 48 hours. Following substantial exposures to moisture, there is an immediate increase in its water content of up to 50% after the first hour and 65-70% after three hours. When it regains moisture, the fern can once again become photosynthetically active, increasing its metabolism and release of organic compounds that provide nutrients for symbiotic bacteria that allow them both to thrive.  

At least one study has shown association between P. polypodioides and moss, indicating that this fern may rely on moss for some of its water needs.
The resurrection ferns accumulate sugar in their dehydrated cells in order to protect them and stabilize the membranes and proteins in the dry state. By accumulating sugar, the cells can maintain hydrogen bonds between necessary macromolecules needed for their structure. An interesting feature of the resurrection fern is it does not immediately uptake water after having been in a desiccated state. The resurrection ferns have porous cell structure networks that can expand and rearrange to accommodate absorbing three to four times their own weight in water after being exposed. Initially, the water flows via capillary pressure into the spongy layer of the epidermis and the porous network of the fern’s leaves, without altering them significantly. Over time, pressure builds up in the fern cell network, changing the turgor pressure and strain in the plant, initiating the unfolding of the leaves. The fern only stops unfolding its leaves when the cell network of the fern is entirely filled with water. The uncurling of the leaves was believed to be an entirely osmotic phenomenon, but when the fern is again exposed to water, it absorbs the water through solid colloids causing an increase in volume and capillary pressure of the cells of the fern.

When the fronds "dry", they curl with their bottom sides upwards. In this way, they can rehydrate the quickest when rain comes, as most of the water is absorbed on the underside of the leaf blades. The fern fronds contain canal cells in the center of their surface scales that direct water to the epidermis of the fern leaves, allowing absorption. The ability of the fern fronds to unroll after exposure to desiccation is attributed to the large cells of the upper epidermis along the midrib of the frond that increase in width more than any other epidermal cell, which forces the fronds to uncurl and flatten out.

One way the resurrection fern has adapted to survive desiccation is the ability of its cell walls to deform and reform, without bursting or rupturing. It has been observed that dehydrins may allow the cell walls of the fern fronds and leaves to deform and reform in times of extreme drought followed by water exposure, due to large fluctuations in water content. Dehydrins were found to be only expressed when the fern was drying or in the desiccated state, with the dehydrins located on the outsides of the cells near the cell walls, allowing the leaves and fronds of the ferns to deform and reform accordingly.

Thermoluminescence of the resurrection fern has been tested to observe at what temperatures it occurs and therefore shows what temperatures and amount of desiccation the ferns can tolerate before their chloroplasts lose the energy they’ve stored for the plant, in the form of light emissions. One study found the resurrection fern to require high temperatures before thermoluminescence occurred at around 50 degrees C whereas other desiccation-tolerant plants showed thermoluminescence at 40 degrees C. The thermoluminescence activity of the resurrection fern increased as it was exposed to six separate but consecutive flashes of green safelight at its leaves. Because thermoluminescence from the fern fronds wasn’t observed until higher temperatures, this hints that the fern’s chloroplasts may have a mechanism to withhold and store energy for the fern as it desiccates that allow it to survive higher temperatures and extreme periods of desiccation.

Reproduction

The fern has spores on the bottom of the fronds, contained in sori. The fern sporulates in Summer and early Fall. Rhizome sections are also viable offspring and can root themselves in new medium.

See also
Resurrection plant

References

Flora of North America: Pleopeltis polypodioides var. michauxiana
USDA Plants Profile: Pleopeltis polypodioides
Flora of Zimbabwe: Polypodium polypodioides subsp. ecklonii
Polypodium polypodioides from the Hardy Fern Library.
Moran, Robbin C., A Natural history of Ferns. Timber Press (2004).
The Relationship Between Pleopeltis polypodioides (Polypodiaceae) and Associated Mosses By John W. Story II
 Florida Plant Atlas Pleopeltis michauxiana
 Florida Plant Atlas Pleopeltis polypodioides
 NASA mission that took Resurrection Fern into space.

  

polypodioides
Epiphytes
Ferns of the Americas
Ferns of Africa
Ferns of the United States
Flora of North America
Flora of South America